Mount Price is a mountain in the Sierra Nevada at the southern end of the Crystal Range, and southwest of Lake Tahoe.  The summit is located in the Desolation Wilderness and the El Dorado County, California.

References

External links
 

Mountains of the Desolation Wilderness
Mountains of El Dorado County, California
Mountains of Northern California